Hebenu is an ancient Egyptian city. It was the early capital of the 16th Upper Egyptian Nome. The modern village of Kom el Ahmar (Minya Governorate) is built on the site where the ancient city stood.

See also
 List of ancient Egyptian towns and cities

Literature 
 Hans Bonnet: Hebenu in: Lexikon der ägyptischen Religionsgeschichte. Hamburg 2000, p. 284. 
 Farouk Gomaa: Die Besiedlung Ägyptens während des Mittleren Reiches, 1. Oberägypten und das Fayyum. Wiesbaden 1986, p. 319–321. 
 Rainer Hannig: Großes Handwörterbuch Ägyptisch-Deutsch: (2800-950 v. Chr.). By Zabern, Mainz 2006, p. 1172.

References 

Cities in ancient Egypt
Populated places in Minya Governorate
Former populated places in Egypt